Jolgeh-ye Mazhan District is in Khusf County, South Khorasan province, Iran. At the 2006 National Census, the region's population (as a part of the former Khusf District of Birjand County) was 12,314 in 3,622 households. The following census in 2011 counted 10,928 people in 3,447 households.

At the latest census in 2016, the district had 9,351 inhabitants in 3,166 households, by which time the district had been separated from the county and Khusf County established with two new districts..

References 

Khusf County

Districts of South Khorasan Province

Populated places in South Khorasan Province

Populated places in Khusf County